Malcolm Beard (born 3 May 1942) is an English former professional footballer born in Cannock, Staffordshire, who made more than 350 appearances in the Football League playing as a wing half.

He spent the vast majority of his playing career at Birmingham City, for whom he made 405 appearances in all competitions. He joined the club as an amateur in 1957 when he left school, and turned professional in May 1959. He also played for Aston Villa and in non-league football for Atherstone Town. He went on to coach in England and abroad, and was employed as chief scout by Leicester City and Aston Villa. He was capped for England at youth level.

Honours
Birmingham City
 Inter-Cities Fairs Cup runners-up: 1960–61
 Football League Cup winners: 1962–63

References

1942 births
Living people
People from Cannock
English footballers
Association football wing halves
Birmingham City F.C. players
Aston Villa F.C. players
Atherstone Town F.C. players
English Football League players
Leicester City F.C. non-playing staff
Aston Villa F.C. non-playing staff